George William "Bill" Domhoff (born August 6, 1936) is a Distinguished Professor Emeritus and research professor of psychology and sociology at the University of California, Santa Cruz, and a founding faculty member of UCSC's Cowell College. He is best known as the author of several best-selling sociology books, including Who Rules America? and its seven subsequent editions (1967 through 2022).

Biography

Early life
Domhoff was born in Youngstown, Ohio, and raised in Rocky River, 12 miles from Cleveland. His parents were George William Domhoff Sr., a loan executive, and Helen S. (Cornett) Domhoff, a secretary at George Sr.'s company.

In high school, Domhoff was a three-sport athlete (in baseball, basketball, and football), wrote for his school newspaper's sports section, served on student council, and won a contest to be the batboy for the Cleveland Indians. He graduated as co-valedictorian.

Education
Domhoff received a Bachelor of Arts degree in psychology at Duke University (1958), where he finished freshman year as sixth in his class, wrote for the Duke Chronicle, played baseball as an outfielder, and tutored the student athletes. As an undergraduate, he also wrote for The Durham Sun and received his Phi Beta Kappa key. He later earned a Master of Arts degree in psychology at Kent State University (1959), and a Doctor of Philosophy degree in psychology at the University of Miami (1962).

Family
Domhoff has four children; his son-in-law is former Major League Baseball player Glenallen Hill.

Career

Academia
Domhoff was an assistant professor of psychology at California State University, Los Angeles for three years in the early 1960s. In 1965, he joined the founding faculty of the University of California, Santa Cruz (UCSC) as an assistant professor at Cowell College; he became an associate professor in 1969, a professor in 1976, and a Distinguished Professor in 1993. After his retirement in 1994, he has continued to publish and teach classes as a research professor.

Over the course of his career at UCSC, Domhoff served in many capacities at various times: acting dean of the Division of Social Sciences, chair of the Sociology Department, chair of the Academic Senate, chair of the Committee on Academic Personnel, and chair of the Statewide Committee on Preparatory Education.
In 2007, he received the University of California's Constantine Panunzio Distinguished Emeriti Award, which honors the post-retirement contributions of UC faculty.

Sociology
Domhoff's first book, Who Rules America? (1967), was a 1960s sociological best-seller, arguing that the United States is dominated by an elite ownership class, both politically and economically. This work was partially inspired by Domhoff's experience of the Civil rights movement and projects he assigned for his social psychology courses mapping how different organizations were connected. It built on E. Digby Baltzell's 1958 book Philadelphia Gentlemen: The Making of a National Upper Class, C. Wright Mills'  1956 book The Power Elite, Robert A. Dahl's 1961 book Who Governs? and Paul Sweezy work on interest groups, and Floyd Hunter's 1953 book Community Power Structure and 1957 book Top Leadership, USA.

Who Rules was followed by a series of sociology and power structure books like C. Wright Mills and the Power Elite (1968), Bohemian Grove and Other Retreats (1974), and three more best-sellers: The Higher Circles (1970), The Powers That Be (1979), and Who Rules America Now? (1983).

Domhoff has written seven updates to Who Rules America?; every edition has been used as a sociology textbook. He also has a "Who Rules America?" web site, hosted by UCSC.

Psychology
In addition to his work in sociology, Domhoff has been a pioneer in the scientific study of dreams. In the 1960s, he worked closely with Calvin S. Hall, who had developed a content analysis system for dreams. He has continued to study dreams up to the present day, and his latest research advocates a neurocognitive basis for future dream research.

He and his research partner, Adam Schneider, maintain two web sites dedicated to quantitative dream research: DreamResearch.net and DreamBank.net.

Selected Bibliography

Who Rules America? 
 1967. Who Rules America? Englewood Cliffs, New Jersey: Prentice Hall.
 1983. Who Rules America Now? A View for the 80's. New York: Simon and Schuster.
 1998. Who Rules America? Power and Politics in the Year 2000. 3rd Edition. Mountain  View, Calif.: Mayfield Publishing Co.
 2002. Who Rules America? Power and Politics. 4th Edition. New York: McGraw-Hill.
 2006. Who Rules America? Power, Politics, and Social Change. 5th Edition. New York: McGraw-Hill.
 2010. Who Rules America? Challenges to Corporate and Class Dominance. 6th Edition. New York: McGraw-Hill.
 2014. Who Rules America? The Triumph of the Corporate Rich.. 7th Edition. New York: McGraw-Hill.
 2022. Who Rules America? The Corporate Rich, White Nationalist Republicans, and Inclusionary Democrats in the 2020s. 8th Edition. Abingdon, UK: Routledge.

Dreams 
 1996. Finding Meaning in Dreams: A Quantitative Approach. New York: Plenum Publishing.
 2003. The Scientific Study of Dreams: Neural Networks, Cognitive Development, and Content Analysis. Washington: American Psychological Association Press.
 2018. The Emergence of Dreaming: Mind-Wandering, Embodied Simulation, and the Default Network. New York: Oxford University Press.
 2022. The Neurocognitive Theory of Dreaming: The Where, How, When, What, and Why of Dreams. Cambridge, MA: MIT Press.

References

External links
Who Rules America?
The Quantitative Study of Dreams
DreamBank.net

21st-century American psychologists
American sociologists
American political writers
American male non-fiction writers
American social sciences writers
Oneirologists
University of California, Santa Cruz faculty
Duke University Trinity College of Arts and Sciences alumni
Kent State University alumni
University of Miami alumni
Writers from Ohio
People from Rocky River, Ohio
1936 births
Living people
20th-century American psychologists